We Need to Talk About Cosby is an American documentary miniseries directed and produced by W. Kamau Bell. It explores the life and career of Bill Cosby up to his sexual assault cases. It premiered on January 30, 2022, on Showtime.

Plot
Comedians, journalists, and survivors have a conversation about the career and sexual assault cases of Bill Cosby.

Episodes

Release
The series had its world premiere at the 2022 Sundance Film Festival on January 22, 2022. It was released on January 30, 2022, on Showtime.

Reception

Critical reception
 Metacritic, which uses a weighted average, assigned the series a score of 83 out of 100 based on 22 critics, indicating "universal acclaim".

Cosby's response
A representative for Bill Cosby issued a statement days prior to the series's premiere, stating: "Mr. Cosby has spent more than 50 years standing with the excluded; made it possible for some to be included; standing with the disenfranchised; and standing with those women and men who were denied respectful work because of race and gender within the expanses of the entertainment industries, continues to be the target of numerous media that have, for too many years, distorted and omitted truths... intentionally. Mr. Cosby vehemently denies all allegations waged against him,  Let's talk about Bill Cosby. He wants our nation to be what it proclaims itself to be: a democracy."

Accolades

Notes

References

External links
 
 Official trailer

2022 American television series debuts
2022 American television series endings
2020s American documentary television series
2020s American television miniseries
English-language television shows
Showtime (TV network) original programming
Documentary films about actors
Films about sexual abuse
Bill Cosby